{{wiktionary|Isaias|Esaias}}Isaías''' is the Spanish and Portuguese language form of the biblical name Isaiah.

Notable people with the name include:

 Isaias of Constantinople (died 1332), Ecumenical Patriarch of Constantinople from 1323 to 1332
 Isaias Afwerki (born 1942), first and current president of Eritrea
 Isaías Benedito da Silva (1921–1947), Brazilian footballer
 Isaías Carrasco (1964–2008), Basque politician
 Isaías D'Oleo Ochoa (born 1980), Costa Rican poet
 Isaías Duarte Cancino (1939–2002), Colombian Catholic priest and Archbishop of Cali
 Isaias W. Hellman (1842–1920), German-born American banker and philanthropist, and a founding father of the University of Southern California
 Isaías Marques Soares (born 1963), Brazilian footballer
 Isaías Medina Angarita (1897–1953), President of Venezuela from 1941 to 1945
 Isaías de Noronha (1874–1963), Brazilian admiral and member of the junta that governed Brazil in 1930
 Isaías Rodríguez (born 1942), Venezuelan politician, diplomat and lawyer, Vice President of Venezuela in 2000
 Isaías Samakuva (born 1946), Angolan politician
 Isaías Sánchez (born 1987), Spanish footballer

See also
 Esaias Tegnér, Swedish writer
 Isaia (name)
 Hurricane Isaias

References 

Masculine given names
Latin masculine given names